Banjska may refer to:

 Banjska Monastery
 Banjska (village)